"My Man (Understands)" is a song written by Billy Sherrill, Norro Wilson and Carmol Taylor, and recorded by American country music artist Tammy Wynette.  It was released in August 1972 as the first single from the album My Man.  The song was Wynette's twentieth release on the country charts.  "My Man (Understands)" went to number one for a single week on the country charts and spent twelve weeks on the chart.

Chart performance

References

1972 singles
Tammy Wynette songs
Songs written by Billy Sherrill
Songs written by Norro Wilson
Song recordings produced by Billy Sherrill
Epic Records singles
Songs written by Carmol Taylor
1972 songs